The women's 500 meter at the 2010 KNSB Dutch Single Distance Championships took place in Heerenveen at the Thialf ice skating rink on Friday 30 October 2009. Although this edition was held in 2009, it was part of the 2009–2010 speed skating season.

There were 22 participants who raced twice over 500m so that all skaters had to start once in the inner lane and once in the outer lane. There was a qualification selection incentive for the next following 2009–10 ISU Speed Skating World Cup tournaments.

Title holder was Annette Gerritsen.

Overview

Result

  DQ = Disqualified
  DNS = Did not start

Draw 1st 500m

Draw 2nd 500m

Source:

References

Single Distance Championships
2010 Single Distance
World